Nurali may refer to:
 Nurali (name)
 Nuralı, Elâzığ
 Nurali Rural District